Peter F. Galligan  (January 20, 1860 – May 20, 1917) was an American politician who also played Shortstop in Major League Baseball in one game for the 1886 Washington Nationals.

Galligan was born in Chicago, Illinois and went to Saint Ignatius College. After his brief appearance in the majors, he played in the Western Association in 1888, the Central Interstate League in 1889 and the Chicago City League in 1891. He also worked in the manufacturing business. Galligan served briefly as a patrolman for the police force before he was elected to the Illinois House of Representatives, where he served from 1897 to 1899 and from 1909 to 1913 and was a Democrat. He also served in the Illinois Senate from 1899 to 1903. Galligan died in Chicago.

References

External links

19th-century baseball players
Major League Baseball shortstops
Washington Nationals (1886–1889) players
Harrisburg Ponies players
Scranton Indians players
St. Louis Whites players
Minneapolis Millers (baseball) players
Chicago Maroons players
Peoria Canaries players
Chicago Garden Citys players
Baseball players from Chicago
1860 births
1917 deaths
American police officers
Businesspeople from Chicago
Politicians from Chicago
Democratic Party members of the Illinois House of Representatives
Democratic Party Illinois state senators
19th-century American businesspeople